Nigel Kennedy (born 24 August 1964) is a Jamaican cricketer. He played in two first-class and two List A matches for the Jamaican cricket team from 1987 to 1990.

See also
 List of Jamaican representative cricketers

References

External links
 

1964 births
Living people
Jamaican cricketers
Jamaica cricketers
Place of birth missing (living people)